Leopold of Anhalt (18 July 1855 – 2 February 1886), was a German prince of the House of Ascania. From 1871 until his death he was heir to the duchy of Anhalt.

Early life
Prince Leopold was born on 18 July 1855 in Dessau as the first child of Hereditary Prince Frederick of Anhalt-Dessau-Köthen and his wife Princess Antoinette of Saxe-Altenburg. He was named after his grandfather Duke Leopold of Anhalt-Dessau-Köthen.

In 1863 his grandfather, Duke Leopold, became Duke of the united Duchy of Anhalt following the death of the last Duke of Anhalt-Bernburg.

On 22 May 1871, Duke Leopold died and Prince Leopold's father succeeded to the Duchy of Anhalt. Leopold himself now became hereditary prince.

Marriage and issue
In the autumn of 1883, Hereditary Prince Leopold proposed to Princess Viktoria of Prussia, daughter of Crown Prince Frederick William of Prussia and Princess Victoria of the United Kingdom. But his proposal was refused. In April 1884 Friedrich von Holstein recorded that:

In the end of December 1883 Hereditary Prince Leopold was engaged to Princess Elisabeth of Hesse-Kassel, the eldest daughter of Prince Frederick William of Hesse-Kassel and Princess Anna of Prussia. When hearing of this engagement, Queen Victoria, whose daughter apparently had not informed her mother of the rejected proposal, wrote:

Leopold and Elisabeth were married on 26 May 1884 at Schloss Philippsruhe in Hanau. They had one daughter:
Antoinette (Schloss Georgium, 3 March 1885 – Dessau, 3 April 1963), married on 26 May 1909 to Prince Frederick of Schaumburg-Lippe.

Death
Less than one year after the birth of his daughter, Leopold died unexpectedly in Cannes on 2 February 1886. As he had no sons, he was succeeded as Hereditary prince by his younger brother Frederick who would eventually become Duke Frederick II of Anhalt.

Princess Elisabeth never remarried and survived her husband by almost 70 years. She died in Dessau on 7 June 1955.

Honours
  Duchy of Anhalt: Grand Cross of the House Order of Albert the Bear, 1873
    Ernestine duchies: Grand Cross of the Saxe-Ernestine House Order, 1875
  Hohenzollern: Cross of Honour of the Princely House Order of Hohenzollern, 1st Class
  Mecklenburg: Grand Cross of the House Order of the Wendish Crown, with Crown in Ore, 17 April 1877

Ancestry

References

1855 births
1886 deaths
People from Dessau-Roßlau
Princes of Anhalt
German people of French descent
Heirs apparent who never acceded
Royal reburials
Sons of monarchs